Come Home Love: Lo and Behold (literally "Love Returning Home, Happy Delivery"), alternately known as Come Home Love: Happy Courrier, is a 2017 daily half-hour Hong Kong sitcom created by TVB, starring Lau Dan, Angela Tong, Koni Lui, Stanley Cheung, Pal Sinn, Mandy Lam, Andrea So, Joyce Tang and Kalok Chow. It is produced by Law Chun-ngok who also produced the three previous Come Home Love. 

Filming began in January 2017 and is filmed as it airs. The series premiered on February 20, 2017, airing every Monday through Friday on Hong Kong's TVB Jade, Malaysia's Astro Wah Lai Toi and Australia's TVB channels during its 8:00-8:30 pm timeslot, with an expected 180 episodes. Due to the show's popularity and high ratings, it has since been extended to 900 episodes and now airs seven days a week. In September 2020 the show aired its one-thousandth episode, exceeding the episode count of the first series. Additionally, it exceeded A Kindred Spirit's episode count (when aired as a sitcom) when its 1128th episode aired, making it one of the longest running drama shows in Hong Kong television history.

Premise
The story revolves around the Hung and Lung family, their work lives and friends, and in earlier episodes Lung King Fung's spirit that the Hung family befriends as one of the family.

Hung Shu Kan (Lau Dan) is the head of the Hung family and also the owner of a transport company.  Kan's younger brother Hung Shu Yan (Pal Sinn), is a photographer who comes to live with Kan. Other members of the Hung family: eldest daughter Hung Sheung Sin (Joyce Tang) who is away in the United States but later returns home; assistant manager of marketing and second daughter, Mary Hung Yeuk Shui (Koni Lui); University student and youngest daughter, Hung Shum Yu (Andrea So); and University student and son of the eldest daughter, Kam Shing On (Kalok Chow).

Early episodes focused on Lung King Fung (Andrew Chan), a rich heir who "died" in a car accident just as Shu Yan was taking pictures nearby. Fung's spirit was transferred into the camera; only the Hung family and certain others who touch the camera can see Fung.

Cast

Hung Family

Lung Family

First Chamber

Second Chamber

Third Chamber

Fourth Chamber

Zip Lung Group / Wai Lung Department Store 

Angela Tong as Ko Pak Fei / David Ko, girlfriend of Hung Shu Yan, E-commerce Director and Head of Wai Lung E-commerce department, aka Cam Bou Tou
Kiko Leung as Anita / Kong Wai Kiu, sister of Venus, works on Wai Lung Department store operations team, former life insurance salesperson
Peter Lai as Ma Pau, works on Wai Lung Department store operations team, landlord of David Ko
Miu Ka Hing as Kwai Suk Ming, works on Wai Lung Department store operations team, IT specialist
Edsel Chiu Ho Ming as Ying Chun, works on Wai Lung Department store operations team
Veronica Shiu as Hau Choi Yan / Yan Yan / Heidi, former personal assistant to David, former girlfriend to Ivan
Jan Tse Chi Lun as Mandy / Lam Mei Heung, Linda Lung Lik Lin's former secretary, best friend of Mary Hung Yeuk Shui, girlfriend of Chun Bok Sze, studying law in England
Cinda Hui Sze Man as 群姐 aka Isabella, Head caretaker of Zip Lung Building
Stanley Cheung as Kung Yip, Marketing Director of Zip Lung Group, husband of Mary Hung Yuk Shui
Lisa Lau as Yeung Yeung, works for Gong Yip in Zip Ling Marketing, girlfriend of Chun Wah
Eileen Yeow as Helen Shum, HR Director at Zip Lung, former girlfriend of KC Ng, former girlfriend of John Wu
Janice Shum as Rebecca / Yip Pik Ka, Executive Secretary of Lung Kam Wai, girlfriend of Wai Lung Shopping Centre Security Guard Cheung Lung, ex-HR Manager at Zip Lung, ex-fiancée of Chan Siu Kuen, broke up with him after he said he didn't love her.
Andy Wong as Chan Siu Kuen aka Iron Face Chan, Head of Security at Zip Lung, former fiancé of Rebecca Yip, former student of Headmaster Tam
Jim Tang as Ivan Chan, Head of Zip Lung Group IT department, boyfriend of May, was initially in fake relationship with May (Kung Yip's former girlfriend before Mary Hung), developed Zip Lung Secret website for Lung Kam Kai
David Do as Peter Kwan Bei Dut, boyfriend of Mia Ma
Tony Chui as Andy Lau, works for Peter Kwan Bei Dut, boyfriend of Elaine
Eddie Li as Chun Wah, Finance Accountant Director at Zip Lung Group finance department, reported to Linda Lung Lik Lin, boyfriend of Yeung Yeung
Gregory Lee as Ho, works at First Love Cafe
Candice Chiu as May / Hei Seung Fei, girlfriend of Ivan Chan, current secretary for Linda Lung Lik Lin, ex-girlfriend of Kung Yip
Phoebe Chow as Tam Ho Ching aka 垃圾清 "Garbage" Ching, former secretary of Linda Lung Lik Lin
Stephen Ho as John Wu Ging Tang, was Director of Legal Affairs at Zip Lung, now works at Dei Lui Holdings, ex-boyfriend of Helen Shum Kai Yi, best friend of KC Ng Ka Chung
Terrence Wong as Cheung Lung, Security guard at Wai Lung Shopping Centre, boyfriend of Rebecca Yip
Stephanie Lee as Elaine, works at Wai Lung Department Store, girlfriend of Andy Lau
Raymond Cho as Chan Wing Lim, works at First Love Cafe, younger brother of Mr. Chan, brother-in-law of Chan Mui Chu 陳師奶
Roxanne Ho as Luna Siu, girlfriend and secretary of Max Lung

Speedy Bear 
Mark Ma Kwun Tung as Chun Pok Sze, godson of Hung Shu Kan, Hung family friend, childhood friend of Mary Hung Yeuk Shui, boyfriend of Mandy Lam Mei Heung
Chun Kai Wai as Ng Sai Lik, employee at Speedy Bear
Vincent Cheung as Tai Lik, employee at Speedy Bear

Hong Kong Island University 

 Kalok Chow as 金城安 Kam Shing On, son of Hong Sheung Sin
 Ricco Ng as 朱凌凌 Chu Ling Ling, Shing On's best friend, aspiring film maker, apprentice of Hung Shu Yan
 Sky Chiu as 艾頓壯 Ai Ton Chong aka Ah Chong, management intern at Zip Lung Sanitation Department (formerly in Security Department)
 Aaryn Cheung as 王國 George Wong, ex-academy business partner of Hung Sum Yu, dorm roommate of Chi Ji Hao, sold academy shares to Linda Lung
 Cheung Sze Yan as Lee Mok Sau, love struck stalker of Chu Ling Ling, actuarial science student.
 Judy Kwong as Venus Kong Pak Wai, ex-girlfriend of Chi Ji Hau, younger sister of Anita Kong (Wai Lung Department store)
 Sophie Yip as Candy
 Keefe Ng as 頭皮 "Dandruff"
 Tom Lo as Oily Face 面油
 Oman Lam as Bookworm 書蟲

Chiu Wai Film Making Company 

 Andrew Yuen as 潮偉 Chiu Wai, owner and founder of Chiu Wai Film Making Company, Hong Sheung Sin's boyfriend
 William Chu as Sing, personal assistant to Chiu Wai
 Lee Kai Kit as Director
 Kinlas Chan as Assistant Director to Director
 Keefe Ng as 頭皮 "Dandruff", production assistant

Chi Family / Tai Chi 

 Ricky Wong as Chi Fu, father of Chi Ji Hao and Chi Mei Lai, Hong Shu Gan's rival
 Hero Yuen as Chi Ji Hao, son of Chi Fu, part-time driver/bodyguard of Lung Kum Wai, boyfriend of Liza, ex-boyfriend of Venus and Hung Shum Yu, student at Hong Kong Island University, dorm roommate of George Wong, kung fu student of Hung Shu Kan
Kitty Chung as Chi Mei Lai, daughter of Chi Fu. She had a crush on Kam Sing On and was once love-rival of Bonnie

Song Family 
 Jack Hui Ka Kit as Sung Shui Fai, former employee of Wai Lung Department store operations team, Good Ba Bar proprietor, husband of Linda Lung Lik Lien
 Dylan Leung as Philip 仔 / Philip Sung, son of Sung Shui Fai, student at Moral Rebuilding Primary School, stepson of Linda Lung Lik Lien

Chu Family 

 John Chan as Martin Chu Chin, father of Chu Ling Ling and Chu Tin Tai, partner at law firm, owns family house in Macau
 Kelvin Leung as Chu Tin Tai, second son of Martin Chu Chin, older brother of Chu Ling Ling, lawyer who works for Chu Chin's firm, passion is making HK style pineapple buns

Tam Family 

 Wing Chun Chan as Headmaster 譚道德 Tam To Tak, father of Bonnie
 Helen Ng as Tam Ho Yung Yee, mother of Bonnie
 Iris Lam as Bonnie / Tam Yuk Ying, girlfriend of idol 葱頭, ex-girlfriend of Kam Shing On, student at Hong Kong Island University, apprentice of Hung Sheung Sin for screen-writing

Genius Academy 

 Andrea So as Hung Sum Yu, co-owner and founder, ex-business partner of George Wong
 Sophie Yip as Candy, teacher
 Tom Lo as Oily Face 面油, teacher
 Oman Lam as Bookworm 書蟲, teacher
 Kelly Gu as June, tarot card expert, relied upon by Linda Lung for tarot card expertise

Building Residence 
 Helen Sun Wai Lin as Chan Mui Chu aka 食屎陳師奶 aka 陳師奶 "Mrs. Chan"
 Wong Chi Wing as 陳生 Mr. Chan, husband of 陳師奶
 Carisa Yan as Miss Ko
 Lesley Chiang as Liza, girlfriend of Chi Ji Hao, Filipino housekeeper of Miss Ko
 Keith Ng Shui Ting as Mr. Lo
 Andrew Chan as Lung King Fung, lives in unit owned by Lung Kam Wai
 Sky Chiu as 艾頓壯 Ai Ton Chong, roommate of Lung King Fung
 Ricco Ng as 朱凌凌 Chu Ling Ling, roommate of Lung King Fung

Other Key Recurring Characters

 Kings Wong as Big Chen, Lung Kam Wai's rival and adversary
 Jason Pai as Lui Gung, father of Jenny Lui, wealthy owner of Dei Lui Holdings, adversary of Lam Kam Wai
 Adrien Yau as 葱頭 "Onion Head", singer idol and actor, boyfriend of Bonnie Tam
 Man Yeung Ching Wah as Dr. Man
 Yvonne Lam as CiCi, Mrs. Ronaldo, wealthy businesswoman, frequent business partner of Zip Lung Holdings
 Julian Gaertner as Mr. Ronaldo, husband of Mrs. Ronaldo, MMA fighter, has competed against Hung Shu Kan in both MMA and fencing
 Penny Chan as Dino, Filipino bodyguard for Lui Gung, former boyfriend of Liza

Notes
Michael Miu and Michelle Yim appeared as a cameo as themselves in episode 997 as spokesperson.
Bobby Au-Yeung appeared as a cameo "Bobby" on episodes 606 (Ending only) and 607.
On episode 606, the new theme song was sung by the cast.
The weekend of June 21, 2019, the cast held a meeting and made a notice to the public about the theme song's change.

References

External links
Official website 

TVB dramas
2017 Hong Kong television series debuts
2010s sitcoms